Ateliotum is a small genus of the fungus moth family, Tineidae. Therein, it belongs to the subfamily Myrmecozelinae.

Species
Ateliotum presently contains the following 13 species: 
 Ateliotum arabicum Petersen, 1961
 Ateliotum arenbergeri Petersen & Gaedike, 1985
 Ateliotum confusum Petersen, 1966
 Ateliotum convicta (Meyrick, 1932)
 Ateliotum crymodes (Meyrick, 1908)
 Ateliotum hungaricellum Zeller, 1839 (= A. cypellias, A. obliterata)
 Ateliotum insularis (Rebel, 1896) (= A. horrealis, A. instratella, A. insulare)
 Ateliotum lusitaniella (Amsel, 1955)
 Ateliotum parvum Petersen, 1988
 Ateliotum petrinella (Herrich-Schäffer, 1854) (= A. turatiella)
 Ateliotum petrinella orientale Petersen, 1973
 Ateliotum reluctans (Meyrick, 1921)
 Ateliotum resurgens (Gozmány, 1969)
 Ateliotum syriaca (Caradja, 1920) (= A. taurensis)

Synonyms
Junior synonyms of Ateliotum are:
 Craterombris Meyrick, 1921
 Dysmasia Herrich-Schaffer 1853
 Hylophygas Meyrick, 1932
 Hyoprora Meyrick, 1908
 Metarsiora Meyrick, 1937
 Saridocompsa Meyrick 1937

Footnotes

References

  (2004): Butterflies and Moths of the World, Generic Names and their Type-species – Ateliotum. Version of 2004-NOV-05. Retrieved 2010-MAY-07.
  [2010]: Global Taxonomic Database of Tineidae (Lepidoptera). Retrieved 2010-MAY-07.

Myrmecozelinae